McClung's Price Place, also known as Hillyrock Farm, is a historic home and farm located at Lewisburg, Greenbrier County, West Virginia.  The farm has been in continued operation since the early 1800s.  During the occupancy of A.P. McClung, the original four room utilitarian log cabin was enlarged to an eight-room house.  The property includes barns and other contributing outbuildings.

It was listed on the National Register of Historic Places in 2007.

References

Colonial Revival architecture in West Virginia
Farms on the National Register of Historic Places in West Virginia
Houses completed in 1800
Houses in Greenbrier County, West Virginia
Houses on the National Register of Historic Places in West Virginia
National Register of Historic Places in Greenbrier County, West Virginia
Log buildings and structures on the National Register of Historic Places in West Virginia